The 1934 New Mexico Lobos football team represented the University of New Mexico as a member of the Border Conference during the 1934 college football season. In their first season under head coach Gwinn Henry, the Lobos compiled an overall record of 8–1 record with a mark of 3–1 against conference opponents, placing second in the Border Conference, and outscored all opponents by a total of 251 to 73. Guyton Hays was the team captain.

Schedule

References

New Mexico
New Mexico Lobos football seasons
New Mexico Lobos football